Arjun Singh Atwal (born 20 March 1973) is an Indian professional golfer who has played on the Asian Tour and the European Tour and is the first player born in India to become a member of, and later win a tournament on the U.S.-based PGA Tour.

Early life

Born in a Sikh family to Harminder Singh Atwal (a well known industrialist) of Asansol and Kolkata, West Bengal, India. He attended St. James' School in Kolkata. Atwal took up golf at the age of 14, playing at the Royal Calcutta Golf Club and Tollygunge Club. He also spent two years at school in the United States, attending W. Tresper Clarke High School, in Westbury, New York.

Career
After turning professional in 1995 he became one of the leading players on the Asian Tour, topping the order of merit in 2003 and becoming the first man to win a million U.S. dollars on the tour by winning the Hero Honda Masters on home soil in the same year. Atwal was the second Indian golfer to earn membership of the European Tour after Jeev Milkha Singh and the first to win on a European Tour event when he notched up a five stroke victory in the 2002 Caltex Singapore Masters, which was co-sanctioned by the Asian and European Tours. A second European Tour win followed at the Carlsberg Malaysian Open in 2003. Late in the same year Atwal finished seventh at the PGA Tour's qualifying school in the U.S., earning a PGA Tour card for 2004, making him the first native East Indian golfer to do so. (The most famous golfer of Indian origin, longtime PGA Tour mainstay and multiple major winner Vijay Singh, is a native of Fiji.) In his 2004 rookie season on the PGA Tour, he finished 142nd on the money list.

In 2005, Atwal came close to winning on the PGA Tour numerous times, most notably at the BellSouth Classic in April. After posting a 64 (the low round for any golfer in the tournament) in the final round of the rain-shortened event, he wound up in a five-man sudden death playoff along with Rich Beem, José María Olazábal, Brandt Jobe and Phil Mickelson. On the first hole of the playoff, the par-5 18th, Atwal's second shot went into the water, yet he almost holed his fourth shot. If he had done so, he would have made birdie and won (Mickelson, Beem and Olazabal made pars, while Jobe bogeyed.) After two-putting the green, Atwal made bogey, and he and Jobe were eliminated. Mickelson went on to win the tournament. Atwal finished 82nd on the money list in 2005 to secure his spot on Tour for 2006.

Atwal was involved in a crash possibly associated with street racing on SR 535, in Windermere, Florida, on 10 March 2007, according to the Florida Highway Patrol. Atwal was not injured, and after a year of investigation, the case was closed with no charges filed. A second driver, John Noah Park, 48, was killed in the incident.

After the 2010 RBC Canadian Open, Atwal lost his PGA Tour card after his medical exemption, received due to a shoulder injury, ran out and he had failed to earn enough money. He later regained his playing privileges on the PGA Tour through 2012 and obtained an invitation into the 2011 Masters Tournament by Monday qualifying for and later recording his maiden victory on the PGA Tour at the Wyndham Championship, the final tournament of the regular season. He became the first Indian-born player to ever win on the PGA Tour, and was the first Monday qualifier to win a PGA Tour event since Fred Wadsworth won the 1986 Southern Open. Because he had lost his tour card, he received no FedEx Cup points for his victory and had not earned enough points previously to make the playoffs. He has been a neighbour and practice partner of Tiger Woods for five years at home in Florida.

After failing to qualify for the FedEx Cup in 2010, Atwal entered the 2011 playoff series 123rd. Atwal had only two top-10 finishes in the two years after his win and lost his Tour card after the 2012 season. In 2014, Atwal had his first win in four years at the Dubai Open on the Asian Tour. The win earned Atwal a two-year exemption on the Asian Tour.

Professional wins (13)

PGA Tour wins (1)

PGA Tour playoff record (0–1)

European Tour wins (3)

1Co-sanctioned by the Asian Tour

European Tour playoff record (1–1)

Asian Tour wins (8)

1Co-sanctioned by the European Tour

Asian Tour playoff record (1–1)

Nationwide Tour wins (1)

Nationwide Tour playoff record (1–0)

Other wins (3)
1995 DCM Open
1997 Classic Southern India Open
2000 Wills Eastern Open

Results in major championships

CUT = missed the half-way cut

Results in The Players Championship

CUT = missed the half-way cut
"T" indicates a tie for a place.

Results in World Golf Championships

"T" indicates a tie for a place.
Note that the HSBC Champions did not become a WGC event until 2009.

Team appearances
Professional
Dynasty Cup (representing Asia): 2003 (winners)
World Cup (representing India): 2005
Royal Trophy (representing Asia): 2006
EurAsia Cup (representing Asia): 2018 (non-playing captain)

See also
2003 PGA Tour Qualifying School graduates
2008 Nationwide Tour graduates
List of golfers with most Asian Tour wins

References

External links

Indian male golfers
Asian Tour golfers
European Tour golfers
PGA Tour golfers
Korn Ferry Tour graduates
Golfers from West Bengal
Golfers from New York (state)
Recipients of the Arjuna Award
Indian Sikhs
People from Asansol
People from Westbury, New York
1973 births
Living people